Gustaf Richard Yngve Larsson (December 13, 1881 – December 16, 1977) was a Swedish political scientist, Municipal commissioner (Borgarråd), and Member of Parliament. He was an important force in the urban development of Stockholm during the post-war years, and came to be called his century's foremost Swedish city builder and Stockholm politician.

Life 
Yngve Larsson was born in Sundsvall but moved to Stockholm in the early 1890s with his family. He studied in Uppsala and was for a time active in radical politics. His graduate studies took place partly in Heidelberg and Berlin, and his doctoral thesis of 1913 focused on issues of urban planning and city administration, which would be the focus of his later career.

Originally a Social Democrat, Larsson was expelled from the party in 1915 for proposing Swedish collaboration with Germany in order to guarantee Finland's independence from Russia. After a few years outside party politics, he joined the Liberal Party in the late 1920s and, after a merger, was a successful candidate for the People's Party (currently The Liberals).

During the Second World War Larsson was a leading advocate for pro-Nordic anti-Nazi politics, and a board member of Samfundet Nordens Frihet and chairman of Svensk-Norska föreningen. 

He was a marked modernist and was for 22 years a leading vice Mayor of Stockholm, in charge of urban development, and politically leading behind several of the city's largest urban development projects of the 20th century, including Slussen, Stockholm Metro and the major redevelopment of Norrmalm borough in central Stockholm. Larsson's role in the post-war planning of Stockholm and its new suburbs was internationally recognized. The American city planner Clarence Stein wrote that:

Later judgments, however, have pointed at the sleazy preparatory work; it was for example assumed that the big corporations needed central offices in central Stockholm but when they were offered building lots after the clearances they declined. Stockholm Municipality was almost bankrupt in 1970 from having to fill the cleared lots at its own expense. Larsson came later to regret his own work and tried, in vain, to stop the clearances. 

He was awarded several Swedish and foreign state orders. In 1946, King Haakon VII appointed Larsson as a Commander with Star of the Norwegian Order of St. Olav "for particularly outstanding merits of the Norwegian Resistance during the war." He also received the French Legion of Honour, Swedish Order of the Polar Star and Order of Vasa and the Order of the White Rose of Finland.

Yngve Larsson was married to Elin (1884-1980), née Bonnier, and they had six children, including later professor Yngve A. A. Larsson.

References

Yngve Larsson at Swedish Wikipedia

Literature in English

External links

1881 births
1977 deaths
Swedish urban planners
Politicians from Stockholm
Municipal commissioners of Sweden
20th-century Swedish politicians
Members of the Riksdag from the Liberals (Sweden)
Uppsala University alumni
Officiers of the Légion d'honneur
Order of the Polar Star
Recipients of the Order of Vasa
Featured articles needing translation from Swedish Wikipedia
Government and politics articles needing translation from Swedish Wikipedia